Too Something (also known as New York Daze) is an American sitcom that aired Sunday at 8:30 on the Fox network in October 1995 and again from May 26 to June 30, 1996.

Premise
The show centered on Eric McDougal, a would-be author, and Donny Reeves, a photographer, who were roommates in Manhattan.

Contest to rename series
The producers ran a contest to rename the series, but it went on hiatus before the show could be renamed. When the series returned in May 1996 its new title was New York Daze and it was introduced by Jeri Dobson of Greensboro, North Carolina who had won the contest, including a trip to Hollywood.

Cast
 Eric Schaeffer as Eric McDougal
 Donal Lardner Ward as Donny Reeves
 Portia de Rossi as Maria Hunter
 Lisa Gerstein as Evelyn
 Larry Poindexter as Henry
 Mindy Seeger as Daisy

Episodes

References

External links
 

1995 American television series debuts
1996 American television series endings
Fox Broadcasting Company original programming
Television shows set in New York City
1990s American sitcoms